Shrike is the name of multiple fictional characters appearing in publications from DC Comics.

Fictional character biographies

Toron Tos

Toron Tos was a super-powered orphan from the highly advanced planet Moronon in the distant Mizar system where everyone has wings. He was raised on Earth by Comoc Indians who believed he was a divine messenger from their ancient god Kukulkán, sent to reclaim their stolen treasures from the white man. As the Shrike (in a long-beaked dark blue and gold "demon bird" costume design submitted by a teenage Dave Cockrum), he encountered Hawkman and Hawkgirl in Hawkman #11 where the Thanagarian police officers captured him after an international crime spree. They convinced him that he was not an avenging deity, but in fact a shipwrecked alien prince. They returned him to his homeworld and, after enduring time-distorting crystal spheres and attacks by flying soldiers and giant lizards, helped him reclaim his throne from the evil dictator Boras Boran who had usurped it from his late parents.

Vanessa Kingsbury
Vanessa Kingsbury was an escaped mental patient who was empowered by the Overmaster and joined his original Cadre. Shrike used her ability to fly and her powerful shriek in battle against the Justice League of America. Her childlike personality made her easily manipulated both by those that wished to use her power and those desiring her body, however her poor grasp of her own strength made her a lethal individual to those she meant no harm. After finding religion and embarking on a "spiritual quest" that left 33 men dead, Shrike was assigned to the Suicide Squad. She again tries to continue her religious education with the Squad's priest. She dies in battle against the Ogaden Military. During the events of Blackest Night, Shrike's corpse is reanimated as a member of the Black Lantern Corps alongside several other fallen Suicide Squad members. A successor calling herself Starshrike joined the Cadre in her place.

Shrike III

The third Shrike is a martial artist created by writers Chuck Dixon and Scott Beatty and artists Javier Pulido and Marcos Martin as a villain to Dick Grayson (Robin) and he appeared in Robin Year One #3.

A member of Ra's al Ghul's League of Assassins, the master martial artist Shrike operated a school for killers which he called the Vengeance Academy, teaching young children how to be assassins. After a disastrous encounter with the villain Two-Face forced Dick Grayson to give up his Robin identity, Dick infiltrated Shrike's school, to earn back Batman's trust. Shrike was apparently the one to teach Dick the art of Escrima stick-fighting, as he was first seen using these weapons after training at the Vengeance Academy. When Shrike took out an assassination contract on Two-Face, he sent a number of his students to carry out the assassination, including Dick and Shrike's top student, a boy named Boone. Dick saved both Boone and Two-Face in the ensuing battle, confirming Shrike's suspicions that Dick was a spy. Batman arrived to save Dick, only to be badly wounded by Shrike. Two-Face himself arrived in the middle of this battle, wishing to kill his would-be assassins and accidentally killed Shrike just as the assassin was preparing to kill Dick. Two-Face escaped, and Shrike's school fled, with Boone greatly upset by the death of his master. Shrike's legacy was picked up by Boone - Shrike. Shrike's namesake, the bird of prey Shrike, is known for catching smaller animals and impaling them on spikes, thorns, barbed wire, etc. The assassin presumably took this name out of a preference for bladed and spiked weapons.  

Shrike revealed that he had been so impressed with Dick's natural talents and martial arts prowess that he had intended to present the young teen to an "O-Sensei". It is unknown whether he referred to the League of Assassins' Sensei, the individual only known as the O-Sensei, Ra's al Ghul, or another individual entirely.

Boone

As a teenager, the boy known only as Boone was a friend of Dick Grayson, who would grow up to become Nightwing. As Grayson was learning under the tutelage of the heroic Batman, Boone was traveling throughout the Pacific Rim, learning martial arts from a number of teachers, including several former members of Ra's al Ghul's League of Assassins. In Hong Kong Boone encountered Shrike, the "Master" that would turn him into a skilled and disciplined killing machine. Boone was part of the Vengeance Academy that Shrike operated in Gotham City, training young teens to become assassins. Dick Grayson, temporarily fired by Batman, infiltrated the school after an "audition" and formed a hesitant friendship with Boone. After Dick revealed the school to Batman following an abortive assassination attempt by the students on Two Face, leading to the death of Shrike by the villain (as mentioned above), Boone swore to avenge his master. After meeting with Talia al Ghul, Boone continued his education by members of the League of Assassins. Taking on his mentor's name, the new Shrike became one of the world's foremost assassins, killing throughout Asia and the former Soviet bloc, before returning to America to become the new chief enforcer of criminal kingpin Blockbuster in order to assassinate Nightwing. He twice failed in this regard. Shrike later appeared, after the death of Ra's al Ghul, as a member of Nyssa al Ghul's new League of Assassins. Like his mentor and their namesake, the Shrike, Shrike uses a number of bladed and spiked weapons, such as swords, bladed tonfa, nets with fishing hooks added to them, and various knives and shuriken.

In Infinite Crisis, Boone joined Alexander Luthor, Jr.'s Secret Society of Super Villains.

Following DC's "Infinite Frontier" relaunch, Boone appears as a member of the Suicide Squad under Peacemaker, and, after the deaths of Bolt and Film Freak, is left to die by Joker's laughing gas. His brother code-named Blue Shrike appears as well, battling Nightwing in honor of his brother on Lazarus Island.

Queen Shrike
The notorious Queen Shrike aka Khea Taramka is the queen of Hawkworld for over two thousand years and returned during Brightest Day. She is allied with Hath-Set, and after capturing Hawkgirl, she reveals that she is the mother of Princess Chay-Ara of Egypt. She kills Hath-Set with her legs. The entity of The Star Sapphires, The Predator takes over the queen. It states to Hawkman and Hawkgirl that this is their last incarnation. The Hawks separate the queen from the entity, then the skeletons from their past incarnations come alive to take the queen to another dimension.

In other media
The Boone version of Shrike appears in Superman/Batman: Public Enemies. He is among the supervillains that attack Superman and Batman.

References

DC Comics martial artists
DC Comics supervillains
Fictional assassins in comics
Comics characters introduced in 1966
Comics characters introduced in 1999
Comics characters introduced in 2000
Characters created by Murphy Anderson
Characters created by Dave Cockrum
Characters created by Chuck Dixon
Characters created by Gardner Fox
DC Comics code names
Suicide Squad members